Naval Construction Battalion 5 was commissioned on May 25, 1942 at Camp Allen Va.  The battalion went to Port Hueneme and shipped out for the first of two deployments in the Pacific.  When the war ended CB 5 was decommissioned in the Philippines.  On July 10, 1951 the Battalion was re-commissioned as a MCB and remains an active unit today.

History

WWII
With pressing construction needs in the Pacific, Naval Construction Battalion 5 was "rushed" in its formation.  With its ranks full of qualified tradesmen the battalion was quickly given its military indoctrination and processed in less than a month for transit to Port Hueneme, Ca.  From there the battalion boarded ship and was the first CB into the Hawaiian Territory.  "NAS Honolulu"  was actually Naval Air Station Barbers Point and it was on CB 5's work list.  Also on the list was Midway Atoll.  Sand Island had another airfield in need of attention.   Rounding out the first deployment were projects on French Frigate Shoals, Canton Island, Johnston Atoll and Palmyra atoll.  At French Frigate shoals an island had to be made for the base and airfield to be constructed upon. CB 5 was rotated CONUS on 19 March 1944, arriving Camp Parks, Ca on March 24. Five's Midway replacement was the 50th CB who arrived on April 4.   From Camp Parks the battalion was transferred to Port Hueneme.  While there the battalion was given its next assignment and attached to Cub-16.  That was canceled with the battalion attached to the 7th Fleet and General MacArthur.  On January 10, 1945 CB 5 departed Port Hueneme for Leyte where it arrived February 15.  Nine days later the battalion would land at it new job site on Calicoan, Samar.  The main projects would be an ABCD,  ACEPD,  NSD and roads and water supply for all of it.   At Calicoan CB 5 had divers doing shallow water work for a seaplane ramp.  There were several detachments, one to both Advance Base Unit 10(NABU-10) and NABU-12.  Able Company went to Balikpapan, Borneo to help the Aussies joining Detachments from the 111th and 113th CBs. On 13 August the battalion learned it was assigned Operation Olympic the first element of Operation Downfall.  Downfall was the plan for the invasion of Japan. Set to begin in November 1945, Operation Olympic was intended to capture the southern third of the Japanese island of Kyūshū.  This was to be followed by Operation Coronet, the second element, which was planned to land near Tokyo. VJ-day terminated these Operations leaving NCB 5 in the Philippines.  CB 5 was then listed to be tasked to the Operation Beleaguer mission in China, but received notice mid-October that was canceled too.   Naval Construction Battalion 5 was deactivated on December 3, 1945.

Korea

On July 15, 1951, CB 5 was reactivated as a MCB.   The Korean War had begun and the Navy realized it had a need for an air station in the region. Cubi Point in the Philippines was selected, and civilian contractors were initially approached for the project. After seeing the Zambales Mountains and the surrounding jungle, they claimed it could not be done. The Navy then turned to the Seabees and was told no problem, Can do. The first Bees to arrive were surveyors of CBD 1802. MCB 3 arrived on 2 October 1951 to get the project going and was joined by MCB 5 in November. Over the next five years, MCBs 2, 7, 9, 11 and CBD 1803 also contributed to the effort. They leveled a mountain to make way for a nearly  runway. NAS Cubi Point turned out to be one of the largest earth-moving projects in the world, equivalent to the construction of the Panama Canal. Seabees there moved  of dry fill plus another 15 million that was hydraulic fill. The $100 million facility was commissioned on 25 July 1956, and comprised an air station with an adjacent pier capable of docking the Navy's largest carriers. Adjusted-for-inflation, today's price-tag for what the Seabees built at Cubi Point would be $906,871,323.53.
The Philippine government did not renew the base's lease with the United States in 1992.  The airfield now Subic Bay International Airport.

Vietnam

From 1965 to 1972, NMCB FIVE made six consecutive deployments to Vietnam.
September 1965 - May 1966, Danang ~ Camp Hoover
October 1966 - June 1967, East Danang ~ Camp Adenir,  assigned to III Marine Amphibious Corps
November 1967 - July 1968,Camp Barnes Dong Ha Combat Base, assigned to III Marine Amphibious Corps
January - October 1969, Danang ~ Camp Hoover
January - October 1970, North Danang ~ Camp Haskins, During this deployment the battalion was visited by many flag officers some of whom visited multiple Detachments multiple times.
VADM E.R Zumwalt Jr., Chief of Naval Operations
VADM J.H. King Jr., Commander U.S. Naval Force Vietnam
RADM J. G. Dillon, Commander 3rd Naval Construction Brigade
RADM A.R. Marschall, Commander 3rd Naval Construction Brigade
RADM Combs COMSERPAC
RADN Bonner NAVSUPPAC Danang
RADM W.H.Heman COMCBPAC
RADM Adamson, Commander Naval Support Activities, Siagon
RADM H.S. Mathews Deputy U.S. Naval Force Vietnam
Lt. Gen H. Nickerson Jr. USMC Commander III Marine Amphibious Corps
Lt. Gen; Buss USMC Commander FMFPAC
 BGEN E.P. Yates USA MACVDC
Commodore Chou RVN Navy Chief of Naval Operations
Mar - Nov 1971, North Danang, Camp Haskins ~ Eight detachments in Vietnam plus dets to the Philippines, Guam , and Alaska.  NMCB 5 was the last battalion to deploy to Vietnam March to November 1971.  The battalion had numerous incidents with mines on that deployment.  NMCB 5 also had an unusual number of flag officer visits again on this deployment.

In 1972, the battalion moved all its troops and equipment to Thailand. The project there was the construction of Nam Phong Air Base.

Seabee Teams

0501 DanPau, Jan 1963
0501 Buom Me Ga,  Apr 1963  7th Special Forces airstrip
0502 Tri Ton Jan 1963
0502 Chau Lang ~ ~ ~ ~ ~ ~ ~5th Special Forces airstrip
0502 Dan Chau,  Jun 1963 ~ ~5th Special Forces Camp and airstrip
0503 Minh Thanh, Jan 1964 ~ 5th Special Forces
0503 Moc Hoa, Mar 1964 ~ ~ 5th Special Forces
0503 Bu Gia Map, Jun 1964 ~ 5th Special Forces
0504 Pleiku, Jan 1964 ~ ~ ~ ~5th Special Forces Camp and airstrip
0504 Kannack Special, Feb 1964 5th Special Forces Camp and airstrip
0504 Dong Ba Thin, May 1964 5th Special Forces Camp and airstrip
0504 Nha Trang, May 1964
0505 Quang Tri, Oct 1964
0505 Phar Rang, Dec 1964
0506 Quang Ngai, Oct 1964
0506 Da Nang, Mar 1965
0507 Dran, Nov 1965
MTT#5 Pleiku, Oct 1965 (Well drilling team)
0509 Thoai Son, Dec 1966
0510 Tan An, Jan 1967
0511 Bao Trai, Sep 1967
0511 Go Dau Ha, Jan 1968
0513 Tan Son Nhut, 0Dec 1968
0513 Ben Tre, Jan 1969
0514 Phu Vinh, Feb 1969
0517 Ben Tre, Apr 1970
Det. Ba To 1970 ~ ~ ~ ~ ~ ~ ~ ~Special Forces Camp runway upgrade
0518 Soc Trang, Mar 1971

Post Vietnam, Iraq
NMCB 5 history

On August 7, 1990 CBs 4, 5, 7, and 40 were ordered to start preparations for Operation Desert Shield.  From January through March, 1991 NMCB Five provided support to the 1st Marine Expeditionary Force for both Operation Desert Shield and Operation Desert Storm.  There were projects at Ahmed Al Jaber Air Base, Ali Al Salem Air Base and Camp Moreell.
On March 21, 2003,  Five's Seabee Engineering Reconnaissance Team SERT-5 along with four other SERTs crossed from Kuwait into Iraq with Task Force Tarawa. They were an element of the 1st Marine Expeditionary Force Engineer Group(1MEF) and the lead SERT for the 2nd Marine Division. Their assignment was to evaluate Road 16 from An Nasiriyah to Amarah and from there Road 17 on to Qalat Sukkar and ultimately to the outskirts of Ad Diwaniyah as well as all the bridges along the way. It is believed that the team was the first Seabees to come under fire since the Vietnam war.   SERT-5 was augmented by three members of UnderwaterConstruction Team 2. SERT-5 was relieved by the SERT-4 at the airfield outside Qalat Sukkar.

NMCB Five was called into action again in support of the Global War on Terrorism during its 2005 deployment. Personnel from NMCB Five were integrated with reserve unit NMCB TWO SEVEN sending over 330 personnel to various locations throughout Southwest Asia. Majority of the work was in support of Special Operations Command with many sites being classified. Many personnel provided direct support to the Iraqi Army by constructing bases and facilities to support their ongoing struggle for stability.
NMCB FIVE was deployed to Afghanistan from February to August in 2009 to work on Camp Leatherneck. The battalion returned again in 2010.

Disaster recovery
 1962 Typhoon Karen  Guam Naval Base,  MCB 5 set up 500 tents for the islanders
 1989 Hurricane Hugo Charleston, SC, Antigua and Puerto Rico
 1995 Hurricane Luis Antigua, St. Thomas, St. John
 1995 Hurricane Marilyn  Antigua, St. Thomas, St. John
 1993 Ventura County fires
 2000 Alaska Airlines Flight 261 crash

List of commanding officers

Unit Awards 
 Navy Unit Commendation 1967 Vietnam
 Navy Unit Commendation 1971,  8 man det Vietnam
 Navy Meritorious Unit Commendation 1971
 Navy Meritorious Unit Commendation 1971, 9 man det Vietnam
 Navy Meritorious Unit Commendation 1971, 14 man det Vietnam
 Navy Unit Commendation 1971 Vietnam
 Navy Meritorious Unit Commendation 1989 
  Coast Guard Meritorious Unit Commendation 2000 
 Navy Unit Commendation 01Mar2005–28Feb2006 2D Marine Division
  Presidential Unit Citation USN/USMC 2009-10 Marine Expeditionary Brigade-Afghanistan 
  Navy "E" Ribbon : –  U.S. Atlantic Fleet Battle "E"  14 times.
Peltier Award: – 4 times.
Best of Type: Seabee Team 0517
Naval Construction Brigade Commander's Commendation 
Commendatory letter, Major General Hugh H. Casey, U.S.Army Chief Engineer 31 Aug, 1945

Campaign and service awards
    Vietnam Service
MCB 5 saw service in 13 of the award periods.

 American Campaign Medal - Territory Hawaii
  Asiatic-Pacific Campaign Medal w/2 bronze stars
  World War II Victory Medal
 Vietnam Campaign Medal service ribbon with 60–  Device : – 
 Vietnam Service Medal: –
 Navy Expeditionary Medal 1979
 U.S. Coast Guard Special Operations Service Ribbon 1989
:Humanitarian Service Medal 1989
  Global War on Terrorism Expeditionary Medal
  Afghanistan Campaign Medal
  Iraq Campaign Medal

See also

Admiral Ben Moreell
Amphibious Construction Battalion 1 (ACB-1)
Amphibious Construction Battalion 2 (ACB-2)
Civil Engineer Corps United States Navy
Naval Construction Battalion
Naval Amphibious Base Little Creek
Naval Amphibious Base Coronado
Naval Construction Battalion Center (Gulfport, Mississippi)
Naval Construction Battalion Center Port Hueneme
Naval Mobile Construction Battalion 1
Naval Mobile Construction Battalion 3
Naval Mobile Construction Battalion 4
Naval Mobile Construction Battalion 11
Naval Mobile Construction Battalion 133
Seabees in World War II
Seabee
Underwater Construction Teams

References

External links and further reading 
Deployment completion reports: After action reports for NMCB-5
5 NCB & NMCB 5 Unit Histories and Cruisebooks NHHC: Seabee Museum

Seabee battalions of the United States Navy
Military units and formations of the Iraq War
United States Navy in the War in Afghanistan (2001–2021)